Laudo Ferreira Jr. (also known as Laudo Ferreira) is a Brazilian comics artist. He began his career in 1983, illustrating for several publishers, as well as working with Advertising and the development of scenarios and costumes for theater. He won the Troféu HQ Mix (most important Brazilian comic related award) in 1995, 2008, 2014, 2015 and 2016. He created the comic adaptations of José Mojica Marins's Coffin Joe movies (At Midnight I'll Take Your Soul and This Night I'll Possess Your Corpse) and several other graphic novels, like Olimpo Tropical (published in Brazil and Portugal) and Yeshuah (an award-winning comic series retelling the life of Jesus based on Bible, apocryphal texts and historical information).

References 

Date of birth missing (living people)
Living people
Brazilian comics artists
Year of birth missing (living people)
Prêmio Angelo Agostini winners
Brazilian erotic artists